The Institute for Law and Politics is an interdisciplinary research institute based at the University of Minnesota Law School.  The Institute for Law and Politics brings together faculty from the Law School and the University of Minnesota Political Science department to study national and international issues at the intersection of law and politics.

The institute's work includes conferences, research and public policy advocacy around issues of election law, campaign finance reform, voting rights, judicial politics, separation of powers and international elections and rule of law.

References

External links
Institute for Law and Politics

University of Minnesota
Legal research institutes